Wes Craven (1939–2015) was an American film director, screenwriter, producer, editor, and actor. He contributed to many projects as either the director, writer, producer, editor, actor, or a combination of the five.

Film

Acting roles

Other credits

Television

TV series

Acting roles

References

External links
 
 
 

Director filmographies